is the tenth single released by the Japanese boyband Kanjani8. The single was released in 2009, the first single from the group since the release of "Musekinin Hero" more than a year prior. The single, like its predecessor, was released in three different editions. The regular edition contained the title track and three B-sides, while the limited editions only contained the title track, one B-side, and a DVD. It also marks the first time since the release of "Sukiyanen, Osaka" in 2005 that a PV DVD was included with one of the group's singles.

The B-side, "Hitotsu no Uta", is a recording from their July Kyocera Dome concert.

Band member You Yokoyama plays on the hidden gag in this single's release as the mysterious director of the television station that the band performs the title song at in the music video. The mysterious director also appears in the CD jacket of the regular edition CD single. The pun is based on Yokoyama's popularity boost due to his portrayal of an unstable television director in the Nihon Television prime time drama, The Quiz Show 2.

Track listings

Regular Edition
 
 "Brilliant Blue"
 "Cinematic"
 
 "Kyū Jō Show!! <Original Karaoke>"
 "Brilliant Blue <Original Karaoke>"
 "Cinematic <Original Karaoke>"
 "Hitotsu no Uta <Original Karaoke>"

Limited Edition A
 "Kyū Jō Show!!"
 "Hitotsu no Uta"

DVD
"Kyū Jō Show!!" (Music Clip)

Limited Edition B
 "Kyū Jō Show!!"
 "Hitotsu no Uta"

DVD
"Hitotsu no Uta" (Music Clip)

Charts

References

2009 singles
Kanjani Eight songs
Oricon Weekly number-one singles
2009 songs